Claddagh Records is a record label, based in Dublin's Temple Bar area, was founded in 1959 by Garech Browne and Ivor Browne. It specialises in Irish traditional music and spoken word. Garech had been taking lessons at the time from the master piper Leo Rowsome, who had made many recordings in the 1920s and 1930s with H.M.V. and Decca, was to be the first artist to record on the Claddagh label. Leo, on the first-ever Claddagh album "Rí na bPíobairí" (King of the Pipers), produced virtuoso uilleann piping. The second album released by Claddagh was The Chieftains' first recording who are most arguably well-known artists in their roster.

Some recorded poets reading their own works amongst whom were, Patrick Kavanagh, John Montague and a young Seamus Heaney. Liam O’Flaherty's 1981 record was the only one of him reading his own work recorded by Claddagh.

Browne, who died in 2018, was an Irish art collector, a notable patron of the Irish arts, traditional Irish music in particular. He is often known by his Irish name, Garech de Brún, or Garech a Brún, particularly in Ireland.

Ivor Browne is an Irish retired psychiatrist, author, former Chief Psychiatrist of the Eastern Health Board, and Professor emeritus of psychiatry at University College Dublin. He is known for his opposition to traditional psychiatry, and his skepticism about psychiatric drugs. Ivor Browne is a notable artist.

Claddagh artists

 The Chieftains
 Ronan Browne
 Peter O'Loughlin
 Peadar O'Loughlin
 Maeve Donnelly
 Seamus Heaney
 Liam O'Flynn
 Tommy Potts
 Bernadette Greevy
 Derek Bell
 Dolores Keane
 John Doherty
 Matt Molloy
 Sean Keane
 Rita Keane
 Siobhán O'Brien
 Len Graham
 Paul O'Shaughnessy

See also
 List of record labels

References

External links
 

Irish record labels
Record labels established in 1959
Spoken word record labels
IFPI members